John Baker Saunders, Jr. (September 23, 1954 – January 15, 1999) was an American musician, known as a founding member and bassist for the American grunge rock supergroup Mad Season, as well as a member of The Walkabouts.

Biography
Saunders was born on September 23, 1954 in Montgomery, Alabama to John Baker Saunders, Sr. and Charleen I. Greer. He attended North Shore Country Day School, Rye Country Day School, Fay School, New Trier High School (East), Cabrillo College and Providence College.

Saunders began his career as a blues bassist, working with traditional blues artists in Chicago, such as Hubert Sumlin and Sammy Fender.  He recorded and toured Europe with the Seattle-based band The Walkabouts. Saunders also worked with The Lamont Cranston Band in Minneapolis.

In 1994, Saunders went into a Minneapolis drug rehabilitation facility, where he met Pearl Jam's Mike McCready. After completing treatment, Saunders and McCready returned to Seattle and formed a band called The Gacy Bunch with vocalist Layne Staley of Alice in Chains and drummer Barrett Martin of Screaming Trees. They soon changed the band's name to Mad Season.  Mad Season's 1995 album Above was awarded a gold record for sales in the United States.  It was the only album that Mad Season would record.

In 1997, when Mad Season vocalist Layne Staley left the band, the remaining members tried to revive the band by finding a new singer.

Saunders had a relapse with heroin and died from an overdose on January 15, 1999.

Aftermath
In 2002, Mad Season vocalist Layne Staley also died of an overdose, leaving Barrett Martin, Mark Lanegan, and Mike McCready as the only members of Mad Season still alive. Lanegan died nearly 20 years later, in February 2022.

References 

1954 births
1999 deaths
American rock bass guitarists
American male bass guitarists
Mad Season (band) members
Deaths by heroin overdose in Washington (state)
North Shore Country Day School alumni
Providence College alumni
Rye Country Day School alumni
Cabrillo College alumni
20th-century American musicians
American male guitarists
Fay School alumni
20th-century American bass guitarists
20th-century American male musicians